189 (one hundred [and] eighty-nine) is the natural number following 188 and preceding 190.

In mathematics
189 is a centered cube number and a heptagonal number.
The centered cube numbers are the sums of two consecutive cubes, and 189 can be written as sum of two cubes in two ways:  and  The smallest number that can be written as the sum of two positive cubes in two ways is 1729.

There are 189 zeros among the decimal digits of the positive integers with at most three digits.

The largest prime number that can be represented in 256-bit arithmetic is the "ultra-useful prime"  used in quasi-Monte Carlo methods and in some cryptographic systems.

See also
 The year AD 189 or 189 BC
 List of highways numbered 189

References

Integers